Grzegorz Czesław Sztolcman (born 23 May 1962 in Częstochowa) is a Polish politician, physician, and Sejm member for the Civic Platform (Platforma Obywatelska).

External links
Grzegorz Sztolcman -- parliamentary page - includes declarations of interest, voting record, and transcripts of speeches.

1962 births
Living people
Civic Platform politicians
Place of birth missing (living people)
Members of the Polish Sejm 2007–2011
Members of the Polish Sejm 2011–2015
Polish physicians